Arthroleptis stenodactylus, the common squeaker, dune squeaker, narrow-footed humus frog, savanna squeaking frog, or shovel-footed squeaker, is a species of frog in the family Arthroleptidae. It occurs widely in the Sub-Saharan Africa and is known from coastal Kenya and eastern and southern Tanzania (including Zanzibar), south to Malawi and Mozambique and southwest to Zambia and southern Democratic Republic of the Congo to western Angola, northern Botswana, Zimbabwe, and northeastern South Africa. An isolated population in Uganda likely represent another species, and it is possible that the current species circumscription includes further cryptic species.

It is typically found in leaf litter. Breeding is through direct development and not dependent on water. The eggs are laid in hollows or burrows in damp earth. It is an abundant species that is not facing significant threats.

References

stenodactylus
Frogs of Africa
Amphibians of Angola
Amphibians of Botswana
Amphibians of the Democratic Republic of the Congo
Amphibians of Kenya
Amphibians of Malawi
Amphibians of Mozambique
Amphibians of South Africa
Amphibians of Tanzania
Amphibians of Zambia
Amphibians of Zimbabwe
Taxa named by Georg Johann Pfeffer
Amphibians described in 1893
Taxonomy articles created by Polbot